Events from the year 1948 in Scotland.

Incumbents 

 Secretary of State for Scotland and Keeper of the Great Seal – Arthur Woodburn

Law officers 
 Lord Advocate – John Thomas Wheatley
 Solicitor General for Scotland – Douglas Johnston

Judiciary 
 Lord President of the Court of Session and Lord Justice General – Lord Cooper
 Lord Justice Clerk – Lord Thomson
 Chairman of the Scottish Land Court – Lord Gibson

Events 
 1 January – A Scottish Region of British Railways begins to operate as a result of nationalisation of rail transport in Great Britain under the Transport Act 1947.
 6 February – Last judicial hanging at HM Prison Perth, Stanislaw Miszka for the murder of Catherine McIntyre.
 June – During this year's Highland Show, held at Inverness, the Royal title is bestowed on the event by King George VI.
 30 June – Glenrothes is designated as a new town under the New Towns Act 1946.
 5 July – The National Health Service begins operating as a result of the National Health Service (Scotland) Act 1947.
 20 October – 1948 KLM Constellation air disaster: A KLM Lockheed Constellation airliner crashes into power cables on approach to Prestwick Airport, killing all 40 on board.
 20 December – Scottish advocate Margaret Kidd becomes the first British woman King's Counsel in Britain.
 Timex watch and clock factory in Dundee begins operation.
 State Institution for Mental Defectives opens at Carstairs for those with mental disorder following temporary use of the premises as an Army hospital.

Births 
 8 January – Gillies MacKinnon, film director
 11 January – Joe Harper, international footballer
 3 February – Maev Alexander, television and stage actress
 9 February – David Hayman, actor and director
 24 February – Walter Smith, football manager (died 2021)
 26 February – Malcolm MacDonald, classical music critic (died 2014 in England)
 3 March – Rosemary Byrne, Scottish Socialist Party then Solidarity MSP (2003–2007)
 7 March - Adam McLean, writer on alchemical texts
 25 March – Lynn Faulds Wood, television consumer affairs presenter and health campaigner (died 2020 in England)
 29 March – Marjorie Ritchie, animal researcher and animal surgeon, part of team who cloned Dolly the sheep (died 2015)
 8 April – Barbara Young, public servant and Labour peer
 20 April – Merlin Hay, 24th Earl of Erroll, colonel and politician, Lord High Constable of Scotland
 28 April – Scott Fitzgerald, born William McPhail, singer and musical actor
 11 May – Fiona Woolf, born Catherine Fiona Swain, lawyer and Lord Mayor of London
 21 May – Denis MacShane, born Denis Matyjaszek, journalist and Labour Party MP
 8 June – Lorna Heilbron, actress
 10 June – Brian Adam, politician and biochemist (died 2013)
 15 June – Henry McLeish, footballer, Labour Party MP (1987–2001), MSP (1999–2001) and First Minister of Scotland (2000–2001)
 19 June – David MacLennan, theatre actor and producer (died 2014)
 20 June – Alan Longmuir, pop guitarist with the Bay City Rollers (died 2018)
 18 July – Jim Watt, lightweight boxer
 5 August – Gordon Jackson, Labour Party MSP (1999–2007) and lawyer
 11 August – Don Boyd, film director, producer, screenwriter and novelist 
 24 October – Frank McPhee, gangland boss (died 2000)
 3 November – Lulu, born Marie McDonald McLaughlin Lawrie, singer
 24 November – Barry Simmons, quiz player
 29 November – David Rintoul, actor
 8 December – Peter Blake, actor (died 2018)
 13 December – Brian Wilson, Labour Party MP (1987–2005)
 31 December – Sandy Jardine, international footballer and manager (died 2014)
 David Annand, sculptor
 James Cosmo, actor
 James Hunter, historian
 John Kay, economist 
 Edward McGuire, composer
 Robert Mone, murderer
 John Lowrie Morrison, artist
 Janet Paisley, writer (died 2018)
 Tom Russell, rock disc jockey

Deaths 
 31 January – Oscar Slater, acquitted of murder (born 1872 in Silesia)
 21 February – Frederic Lamond, classical pianist and composer, pupil of Franz Liszt (born 1868) 
 9 March - William J. Watson, toponymist (born 1865)
 27 March - Douglas Ainslie, poet, translator, critic and diplomat (born 1865) 
 28 May – Unity Mitford, socialite and fascist (born 1914 in England)
 1 June – David Anderson, Lord St Vigeans, Scottish advocate and judge, Chairman of the Scottish Land Court 1918–34 (born 1862)
 21 June – D'Arcy Wentworth Thompson, biologist (born 1860)
 17 July – Joseph Westwood, Labour MP (1922–31, 1935-1948) (born 1884)
 19 November – Charles Jarvis, soldier, Victoria Cross recipient (born 1881)
 24 November - O. Douglas, novelist (born 1877)

The arts
 Sydney Goodsir Smith's Under the Eildon Tree: a poem in XXIV elegies is published in Edinburgh.

See also 
 1948 in Northern Ireland

References 

 
Years of the 20th century in Scotland
Scotland
1940s in Scotland